, stylized as GANG PARADE (formerly known as Pla2me (プラニメ) and POP (ピォピ)) is a Japanese alternative idol girl group formed in 2014. In 2020, Gang Parade split into two groups: Go to the Beds and Paradises. They resumed activities in 2022.

History

2014–2015: Debut as Pla2me, Reformation as POP and P.O.P
On September 30, 2014, the duo Pla2me consisting of members Saki Kamiya and Mari Mizuta debuted under T-Palette Records with the single "Plastic 2 Mercy".

They released their second single, "Unit", on January 6, 2015.

On April 1, Mari Mizuta withdrew from Pla2me due to "difference in opinion".

On June 1, 2015, Pla2me changed their name to POP (Period Of Plastic 2 Mercy) and added four new members (Miki Yamamachi, Yua Yumeno, Ao Shigusawa and Maaya Inukai) to the group.

The group released their first album, P.O.P, on August 4.

Their first single as POP, "Happy Lucky Kirakira Lucky", was released on December 8.

2016: Rename to Gang Parade and Barely Last
The group's fourth single overall, "Queen of POP", was released on March 15, 2016.

On June 17, POP changed their name to Gang Parade. They released their first single as Gang Parade, "We Are The Idol", on July 19.

On July 20, Ao Shigusawa withdrew from the group as her family did not support her musical career.

In October, Gang Parade held their first concert tour, the Barely Last Tour. During the tour on October 2, new member Can GP Maika joined the group. On October 6, new members Coco Partin Coco, Yuka Terashima and Yui Ga Dockson joined the group.

The group released their second album overall and first as Gang Parade, Barely Last, on November 8.

2017–2018: Gang Parade Takes Themselves Higher!!
In April 2017, Gang Parade embarked on their second concert tour, the Gang Parade Body & 7 Soul Tour. Their sixth single, "Foul", was released on April 25.

In July, Gang Parade embarked on their third concert tour, the Gang Parade Beyond The Mountain Tour. Their seventh single, "Beyond the Mountain", was released on July 25.

The group's third album, Gang Parade Takes Themselves Higher!!, was released on November 21.

From January to February 2018, Gang Parade embarked on their fourth concert tour, the Gang Parade Breaking The Road Tour. Their eighth single, "Breaking The Road", was released on February 20.

On April 17, two new members, Usagi Tsukino and Haruna Bad Chiiiin joined the group.

Their ninth single, "Gang 2", was released on May 29.

From July to September Gang Parade embarked on their fifth concert tour, the Gang Parade Rebuild Tour. Their tenth single, "Can't Stop", was released on September 11.

2019: Last Gang Parade and new label
The group's fourth album, Last Gang Parade, was released on January 8, 2019.

On March 20, new member, Naruhaworld was revealed to be joining the group on May 26.

Their eleventh single, "Brand New Parade", was released on April 17, through their new label Fueled By Mentaiko.

Gang Parade embarked on their sixth concert tour, the Challenge The Limit Tour in May, followed by their seventh concert tour, Parade Goes On Tour, from September to November.

The group's fourth album, Love Parade, was released on November 1.

2020–2021: Member departures and group split
On January 3, 2020, Saki Kamiya announced that she would leave the group at the end of their first hall tour.

On January 29, the double A-side single, "Namida no Stage / Fix Your Teeth", was released.

On February 20, Haruna Bad Chiiiin withdrew from the group.

On March 28, Gang Parade split into two groups: Go to the Beds, consisting of Miki Yamamachi, Yua Yumeno, Can GP Maika, Yui Ga Dockson and Coco Partin Coco, and Paradises, consisting of Yuka Terashima, Usagi Tsukino and Naruhaworld. They released the split EP, G/P, consisting of three songs per group and Saki Kamiya's final solo song before graduating from Gang Parade on May 22.

The group's eighth concert tour, My First Hall Tour, was cancelled due to the COVID-19 pandemic. 

On May 22, Saki Kamiya left the group via a livestream instead of the concert scheduled for the same day because of the ongoing COVID-19 pandemic.

On May 22, 2021, Gang Parade held their final concert with Saki Kamiya, Forever Gang Parade Forever, at Nakano Sun Plaza.

2022: Resuming activities and new members
On January 2, 2022, Gang Parade resumed activities with the addition of Kila May, Ca Non and Changbaby as new members. They released the single, "Parade Goes On", on March 9.

On March 26, it was announced that two new members, Ainastar and Potential (then known as Tantan), would join the group on May 13. Naruhaworld resumed activities on the day that they joined.

On May 25, they released the compilation album, Welcome to Gang Parade, consisting of previously released Gang Parade, Go to the Beds and Paradises songs with updated vocals by the new thirteen member line-up. They released the single, "Signal", on July 13. The deluxe edition of Welcome to Gang Parade was released on July 30. The single "Priority" was released on November 16. The complete edition of Welcome to Gang Parade was released on November 21. The group performed the theme song, "lol", for Me & Roboco.

2023: Our Parade
They will release their fifth album, Our Parade, on May 10.

Members

Current

Former

Timeline

Discography

Studio albums

Compilation albums

Singles

Filmography

Blu-rays

Concerts and tours

Tours
 Barely Last Tour (2016)
 Gang Parade Body & 7 Soul Tour (2017)
 Gang Parade Beyond The Mountain Tour (2017)
 Gang Parade Breaking The Road Tour (2018)
 Gang Parade Rebuild Tour (2018)
 Challenge The Limit Tour (2019)
 Parade Goes On Tour (2019)
 My First Hall Tour (2020; Cancelled)
 Gang Parade The Greatest Show Tour (2022)
 Everything Must Go Tour (2022)
 Never Ending Parade Tour (2023)

Concerts
 Pla2me Say Hello (2014)
 Pla2me Say Hello Hello (2014)
 Pla2me Nagoya Say Hello (2014)
 Pla2me Osaka Say Hello (2014)
 Period Of Plastic 2 Mercy (2015)
 Come Back My (2015)
 Queen Of POP (2016)
 We Are The Idol (2016)
 Barely Last (2016)
 Girl Parade (2017)
 Gang Parade Girls Park (2018)
 Gang Parade Making The Road (2018)
 Gang 2 (2018)
 Forever Gang Parade Forever (2021)
 Girls Parade (2022)
 Lovers Parade (2022)
 Gang Parade Memorial Live -Past, Now, and Future- (2023)

Awards and nominations

References

Japanese idol groups
Japanese pop music groups
Musical groups established in 2014
Musical groups from Tokyo
2014 establishments in Japan